Eugen Haugland (12 July 1912 – 21 October 1990) was a Norwegian triple jumper. He represented Haugesund IL.

He was a brother of Jens Edv. Haugland, father of Terje Haugland and grandfather of Hanne Haugland.

At the 1936 Summer Olympics he finished fourteenth in the triple jump final with a jump of 14.56 metres. He became Norwegian champion in 1931, 1933-1937 and 1948.

His personal best jump was 15.23 metres, achieved in August 1938 in Haugesund.

References

1912 births
1990 deaths
Norwegian male triple jumpers
Athletes (track and field) at the 1936 Summer Olympics
Olympic athletes of Norway